Yaroslav Oleksandrovych Plechiy (born 21 May 1999) is a Ukrainian professional footballer who plays as a right back.

References

External links
 Profile on VPK-Ahro Shevchenkivka official website
 

1999 births
Living people
Sportspeople from Sumy
Ukrainian footballers
Association football defenders
FC Metalist Kharkiv players
FC Zorya Luhansk players
FC Olimpik Donetsk players
FC Kramatorsk players
FC Krystal Kherson players
FC VPK-Ahro Shevchenkivka players
Ukrainian First League players
Ukrainian Second League players